Spring Mountain Road is a major east-west road in the Las Vegas Valley. It runs from Hualapai Way at its western terminus to Las Vegas Boulevard in the east. East of Las Vegas Boulevard, Spring Mountain becomes Sands Avenue, and then jogs south to join Twain Avenue. State Route 591 (SR 591) was a state highway that comprised a  section of Spring Mountain at Interstate 15.

The street is located in the unincorporated towns of Paradise (east of Decatur Boulevard) and Spring Valley (west of Decatur). It is the main thoroughfare of Las Vegas's Chinatown.

State highway route
SR 591 began at the intersection of Spring Mountain Road and Aldebaran Avenue.  From there, it proceeded east under Interstate 15 and terminated near Highland Drive.  Highland Drive intersects Spring Mountain Road in the form of a ramp from southbound Highland to westbound Spring Mountain, underneath I-15.

As of January 2008, SR 591 had been decommissioned. Although not maintained as a state route, Nevada DOT still maintains the former highway as a frontage road (FR CL 51).

Landmarks
Chinatown
Desert Breeze Park
Fashion Show Mall
MSG Sphere Las Vegas (under construction)
The Palazzo
Sands Expo
Treasure Island Hotel and Casino
Wynn Las Vegas

Public transport
RTC Transit Routes 119 & 203 function on this road.

References

Streets in the Las Vegas Valley
Paradise, Nevada
Spring Valley, Nevada